Anania coronata, the elderberry pearl, elder pearl or crowned phlyctaenia, is a species of moth of the family Crambidae. It was described by Johann Siegfried Hufnagel in 1767 and is found in the northern parts of the Palearctic realm. It was previously also listed for the Nearctic realm. The species closely resembles Anania stachydalis.

The wingspan is 23–26 mm. Forewings dark fuscous, sprinkled with yellow-whitish; first line indistinct, preceded by a whitish dot; second dark fuscous, posteriorly with a waved whitish-yellowish edging, middle third forming a quadrangular projection including a pale whitish-yellowish blotch, below this with a loop inwards enclosing a whitish-yellowish spot; orbicular dot and transverse discal mark darker, separated by a square whitish-yellowish spot. Hindwings as forewings, but anterior markings obsolete, posterior pale blotches much enlarged. The larva is whitish-green; dorsal and subdorsal lines green; incisions yellowish; on 3 and usually 4 a black lateral spot.
The moth flies from May to August depending on location.

The larvae feed on elderberry, Calystegia sepium, sunflower, Ligustrum, Viburnum and common lilac.

References

External links
 
 Anania coronata at UKMoths
 Phlyctaenia coronata at Lepidoptera of Belgium
 Lepiforum.de
 Waarneming.nl 

Pyraustinae
Moths described in 1767
Palearctic Lepidoptera
Taxa named by Johann Siegfried Hufnagel